CHJX-FM is a Canadian radio station, broadcasting 24 hours a day on 99.9 FM in London, Ontario. The station airs a Contemporary Christian music format branded as Faith 99.9 (ninety-nine nine). CHJX-FM broadcasts several evangelistic teaching programs, Christian music in the morning and mid-day, with Christian contemporary music during the evening and overnight.

Formerly branded as Grace FM, Inspire FM, and later Faith FM CHJX is part of Sound of Faith Broadcasting Inc., with sister stations in Kitchener and Woodstock. Faith 99.9 is listener-supported and depends upon local advertising and listener donations to fund its operations.

History 
Sound of Faith Broadcasting received CRTC approval to broadcast on the FM dial at 105.9 MHz on December 9, 2002 with an effective radiated power of 10 watts. The CRTC got 186 letters of support of the application.

CHJX-FM began on-air testing in February 2004. After fundraising the station began broadcasting from 100 Fullarton st with a transmitter atop One London Place.

In 2006 Sound of Faith Broadcasting applied for a frequency change for CHJX-FM from 105.9 FM to 98.1 FM. Despite support for the change from listeners and other stations, the CRTC denied the application.

CHJX-FM studios were moved in 2008 to the upper floors of YFC London located at 254 Adelaide Street South

July 5, 2010 Grace FM rebranded as Inspire FM, launching a new site but keeping the same format Christian format.

In August 2012, Sound of Faith Broadcasting got approval for a new frequency 99.9 MHz. They began broadcasting on August 31, 2012. Their new frequency had an effective radiated power of 500 watts with a directional antenna system primarily towards the east to protect other stations that broadcast on or near 99.9 MHz, including CFGX-FM in Sarnia, CKFM-FM in Toronto, WKKO in Toledo, Ohio and possibly WXKC in Erie, Pennsylvania.

In October 2012, CHJX changed their branding to Faith FM with a new tagline, "your inspiration station." They moved their offices soon after to 100 Wellington St in South London.

In June 2022, CHJX changed their branding to Faith 99.9 launching a new site, logo and tagline "Your friendly voice of hope."

Programming 

The station hosts a number of different pre-recorded and live content. The station's morning show "Faith Mornings with Shaun" runs from 6:00 AM to 8:30 AM and is hosted by Shaun Mackenzie. From 8:30 AM until 12:15 PM the station runs a variety of talk programming including syndicated programs from Focus on The Family, Haven Today and Copland Financial Ministries.

The mid-day is filled with Contemporary Christian Music until the afternoon show "Heading Home with Marion" from 2:00 PM to 6:00 PM hosted by Marion. The evening is filled with a variety of shows depending on the day with talk programming from Grace to You, Focus on The Family and Turning Point as well as pre-recorded music shows such as The Beautiful Ones with Sandy MacKay.

The weekends have no live programming and are largely talk programming and shows in the morning with music for the rest of the day. Sunday mornings are a variety of weekend shows with preaching and teaching.

References

External links
Faith FM 99.9
 
 

Hjx
Hjx
Radio stations established in 2002
2002 establishments in Ontario